Puromycin-sensitive amino peptidase also known as cytosol alanyl aminopeptidase or alanine aminopeptidase (AAP) is an enzyme that in humans is encoded by the NPEPPS gene.  It is used as a biomarker to detect damage to the kidneys, and that may be used to help diagnose certain kidney disorders. It is found at high levels in the urine when there are kidney problems.

Function 

This gene encodes the puromycin-sensitive aminopeptidase, a zinc metallopeptidase which hydrolyzes amino acids from the N-terminus of its substrate. The protein has been localized to both the cytoplasm and to cellular membranes. This enzyme degrades enkephalins in the brain, and studies in mouse suggest that it is involved in proteolytic events regulating the cell cycle. It has been identified as a novel modifier of TAU-induced neurodegeneration with neuroprotective effects via direct proteolysis of TAU protein. The loss of NPEPPS function exacerbates neurodegeneration.

Structure

Gene
The NPEPPS gene is located at chromosome 17q21, consisting of 25 exons and spanning 40 kb.

Protein
NPEPPS is a ubiquitous, 100 kDa, Zn2+ metallopeptidase highly expressed in the brain. Two isozymes have been found and they are expressed differently in the nervous system. Glu 309 is one of the active site glutamates, and its mutation could convert the enzyme into an inactive binding protein.

Function 

NPEPPS has been proposed to function in a variety of processes, including metabolism of neuropeptidase, regulation of the cell cycle, and hydrolysis of proteasomal products to amino acids. NPEPPS is a major protease to digest SOD1, similar to its role in TAU-induced neurodegeneration. NPEPPS is also reported to play a role in creating and destroying MHC class I-presented peptides and in limiting MHC class I Ag presentation in dendritic cells.

Clinical significance

NPEPPS is induced in neurons expressing mutant huntingtin and is critical in preventing the accumulation of polyglutamine in normal cells. It has been reported as the major peptidase digesting polyglutamine sequences in neurodegenerative diseases, such as Huntington's disease. It has been shown that elevation of NPEPPS activity in vivo could effectively block accumulation of hyperphosphorylated TAU protein and thus slow down the disease progression, suggesting increasing NPEPPS activity may be a feasible therapeutic approach to eliminate accumulation of toxic substrates, which are involved in neurodegenerative diseases.

Interactions 

Cyclin-dependent kinase 5
SOD1 
TAU 
Tetrahydropyridine
β-amyloid

References

Further reading